Caledonia is a village in the town of Caledonia, Livingston County, New York, United States. The population was 2,201 at the 2010 census, out of 4,255 in the entire town. The name refers to Scotland.

History 

The town was settled around 1797 by families from Scotland. In 1803, the town was incorporated into New York as "Southampton". The name later changed to "Caledonia". The village of Caledonia was incorporated in 1891.

The village forms many associations with the adjacent hamlet of Mumford (town of Wheatland), even though they are in different counties. Wheatland was formed as the town of Inverness from the town of Caledonia in 1821. Inverness' name later changed to "Wheatland", as the town did not share the Scottish ancestry of Caledonia.

The fish hatchery at the north end of Caledonia village was built by Seth Green and is the oldest in the United States.

The Caledonia Fish Hatchery, Caledonia House Hotel and Clark-Keith House are listed on the National Register of Historic Places.

Notable people 
 Angus Cameron, member of the United States Senate from Wisconsin; born in Caledonia
 Matt Cappotelli, former professional wrestler

Government 
Caledonia is made up of a Village and a Town. The current officials are: Daniel Pangrazio (Town Supervisor), Seth Graham (Town Clerk), Scott DiLiberto (Mayor), and Ann Marie Grattan (Village Clerk).

Geography 
Caledonia is located in the northernmost part of Livingston County at  (42.973621, -77.854309).

The Caledonia Fish Hatchery is at the north end of the village along an unnamed creek that flows north to Oatka Creek in Mumford and is part of the Genesee River watershed.

New York State Route 36 intersects New York State Route 5 in Caledonia.

Demographics 

At the 2000 census, there were 2,327 people, 902 households and 645 families residing in the village. The racial makeup was 93.47% White, 3.95% Black or African American, 0.21% Native American, 0.69% Asian, 0.26% from other races, and 1.42% from two or more races. Hispanic or Latino of any race were 0.95% of the population.

There were 902 households, of which 37.7% had children under the age of 18 living with them, 56.8% were married couples living together, 11.2% had a female householder with no husband present, and 28.4% were non-families. 24.3% of all households were made up of individuals, and 10.9% had someone living alone who was 65 years of age or older. The average household size was 2.57 and the average family size was 3.06.

27.4% of the population were under the age of 18, 7.3% from 18 to 24, 29.0% from 25 to 44, 23.5% from 45 to 64, and 12.8% who were 65 years of age or older. The median age was 38 years. For every 100 females, there were 95.9 males. For every 100 females age 18 and over, there were 91.7 males.

The median household income was $44,309 and the median family income was $50,526. Males had a median income of $38,587 and females $27,917. The per capita income was $19,753. About 4.4% of families and 5.2% of the population were below the poverty line, including 7.4% of those under age 18 and 1.2% of those age 65 or over.

Community amenities 

Caledonia's high school is Caledonia-Mumford Central School. The school's athletic teams are known as the Raiders. Among the stores, restaurants, and public amenities are The MarketPlace Grocery, C.S. Barber, Pizza Land, Daffies Pizza, Seth Graham Design, The Cozy Kitchen, Dollar General, Milex Drugs, Raider Lanes, Gigglin' Pig, Caledonia Library, Iroquois Hotel, and The Village Inn.

The Caledonia Fire Department was established in 1887, existing until recently as both a Rural Fire Commission and a Village Fire Department. Currently, the Caledonia Fire District is the elected body which provides oversight and for financial needs of the emergency operations. The Fire Department provides manpower for the Fire District and holds social events and fund raisers for the benefit of the membership.

Ambulance services are provided by Genesee Valley Emergency Medical Services providing two ambulances and one advanced life support fly car. These services are available for both the village and town residents and reside within the Caledonia Fire District fire hall.

References

External links
 
 Town of Caledonia
 Caledonia-Mumford Central School District

Villages in New York (state)
Rochester metropolitan area, New York
Populated places established in 1803
Villages in Livingston County, New York
1803 establishments in New York (state)